Ockenfels is a municipality Rhineland-Palatinate, Germany

Ockenfels may also refer to:

People:
 Axel Ockenfels (born 1969), German economist
 Frank W. Ockenfels III, American photographer
 Wolfgang Ockenfels, German Catholic priest and professor of Social Ethics
Other:
SS Ockenfels, German cargo ship built in 1910